Lawrence Township is one of the twenty-two townships of Tuscarawas County, Ohio, United States.  The 2000 census found 5,241 people in the township, 4,154 of whom lived in the unincorporated portions of the township.

Geography
Located in the northern part of the county, it borders the following townships:
Pike Township, Stark County - northeast
Sandy Township - east
Fairfield Township - southeast
Dover Township - south
Franklin Township - west
Bethlehem Township, Stark County - northwest

Two villages are located in Lawrence Township: Bolivar in the north, and Zoar in the east. The census-designated place of Wilkshire Hills occupies the northeast corner of the township, between Bolivar and Zoar.

Name and history
The first white settlement in Lawrence Township was Lawrenceville, founded by Abraham Mosser in 1805 opposite Bolivar on the Tuscarawas River in the area that is now Wilkshire Hills.

Statewide, other Lawrence Townships are located in Lawrence, Stark, and Washington counties.

Government
The township is governed by a three-member board of trustees, who are elected in November of odd-numbered years to a four-year term beginning on the following January 1. Two are elected in the year after the presidential election and one is elected in the year before it. There is also an elected township fiscal officer, who serves a four-year term beginning on April 1 of the year after the election, which is held in November of the year before the presidential election. Vacancies in the fiscal officer-ship or on the board of trustees are filled by the remaining trustees.  The current trustees are Donald Ackerman, Matt Ritterbeck, and Michael Haueter, and the fiscal officer is John McClellan.

References

External links
County website

Townships in Tuscarawas County, Ohio
Townships in Ohio